Gustavo Leonardi (27 February 1869, Civezzano, County of Tyrol – 25 August 1918, Vintimille) was an Italian entomologist.

Leonardi was an entomology assistant in the universities of  Padua and Portici before becoming a plant disease inspector at Vintimille. He wrote 45 publications on pest insects, such as Monografia delle Cocciniglie italiane (1920). With Agostino Lunardoni (1857–1933), he wrote a four volume treatise on pest insects in Italy (1889–1901).

References

Cesare Conci et Roberto Poggi (1996), Iconography of Italian Entomologists, with essential biographical data. Memorie della Società entomologica Italiana, 75 : 159-382.

1869 births
1918 deaths
People from Trentino
People from the County of Tyrol
Italian entomologists